The Singles' Day or Double 11, originally called Bachelors' Day, is a Chinese unofficial holiday and shopping season that celebrates people who are not in a relationship. The date, 11 November (11/11), was chosen because the numeral 1 resembles a bare stick, which is Chinese Internet slang for an unmarried man who does not add 'branches' to the family tree. The four '1's also abstractly refer to the demographic group of single people. Ironically, the holiday has become a popular date on which to celebrate relationships: more than 4,000 couples got married in Beijing on this date in 2011, far greater than the daily average of 700 marriages.

Originally, the date was celebrated as a cynical response to traditional couple-centric festivals by a small group of college bachelors. However, in 2009 Alibaba's CEO Daniel Zhang began to use the day as a 24-hour shopping holiday festival that offered online shopping discounts and offline entertainment. The holiday has now become the largest physical retail and online shopping day in the world. Rivals of Alibaba, such as JD.com hosts Singles' Day festival as well, which garnered US$19.1 billion, bringing the Chinese total to US$44.5 billion total sales volume in 2017.  Alibaba shoppers exceeded 213.5 billion yuan (US$30.7 billion) in total spend during 2018 Singles Day. In 2019, Alibaba said that its gross merchandise volume for the whole event came in at 268.4 billion yuan (US$38.4 billion), an increase of 26% from the previous year. In 2021, Alibaba and JD reached a new combined Singles Day sales record of US$139 billion.

In 2022, both Alibaba and JD.com for the first time did not disclose the Singles' Day sales results as China continues to face macroeconomic headwinds and zero-Covid-19 challenges. However, Alibaba said its results were "in line with [2021's] GMV performance," while JD.com said it set a record-breaking Singles' Day event.

Origins
The Singles' Day, or Bachelors' Day, originated at Nanjing University in 1993. Singles' Day celebrations spread to several other universities in Nanjing during the 1990s. 11 November (11/11), consisting of four 1's, was chosen as it represents four singles.

There are several ideas explaining the creation of the Singles' Day festival. The most widely accepted idea is that the holiday grew out of Nanjing University's dorm culture. One origin story is that in 1993, four male students of Nanjing University's Mingcaowuzhu (all single men) dorm discussed how they could break away from the monotony of being single and agreed that 11 November would be a day of events and celebrations in honor of being single. These activities spread through the university and eventually made their way into wider society. The spread increased with social media use, and the event has become increasingly popular within contemporary Chinese culture and society.

Description 

Singles' Day serves as an occasion for single people to meet and for parties to be organized. The holiday was initially only celebrated by young men, hence the initial name Bachelors' Day. However, it is now widely celebrated by both sexes. Blind date parties are popular on this day, in an attempt to alter the single status of the participants. Some universities organize special programs to gather singles together for the celebration. Singles may take on an annoyed or self-deprecating attitude in response to remaining single as a university student, but university initiatives have helped curb that negativity. Although this date is meant to celebrate singlehood, the desire to find a spouse or partner is often expressed by young Chinese people on this date, while other love-related issues are discussed by the Chinese media.

Shopping 
The event is not an officially recognized public holiday in China, although it has become the largest offline and online shopping day in the world. Sales in Alibaba's e-commerce websites, Tmall and Taobao, have reached US$5.8 billion in 2013, US$9.3 billion in 2014, US$14.3 billion in 2015, US$17.8 billion in 2016, and over US$25.4 billion in 2017. JD.com also achieved a sales record of US$19.1 billion in 2017, while Lazada drums up US$123 million.

As more people join in the celebration of this holiday, many companies have taken the opportunity to target younger consumers including businesses such as restaurants, karaoke parlors, and online shopping malls. For example, the Chinese online shopping mall Taobao sold goods worth 19 billion CNY (about US$3 billion) on 11 November 2012.

On Singles' Day 2017, Alibaba set a world record for most payment transactions during the festival. Its mobile wallet app Alipay processed 256,000 payment transactions per second. A total of 1.48 billion transactions were processed by Alipay in the entire 24 hours, with delivery orders through Cainiao (Alibaba's logistics affiliate) reaching close to 700 million, breaking the previous record set in 2016. The event is now nearly four times the size of America's biggest shopping days, Black Friday and Cyber Monday.

Cultural Events 

Singles' day have come to also represent as a cultural event. Alibaba usually hosts large celebratory festivals on the night before its biggest shopping day and have featured global celebrities including Nicole Kidman in 2017, Taylor Swift at Alibaba's Shanghai gala in 2019, and Katy Perry performing in a livestream in 2020. Not merely a shopping event but the holiday is also a day when people can party to socialize and meet other people, as well as practising traditions that celebrate the single life.

2011 marked the Singles Day of the Century (Chinese pinyin: Shiji Guanggun Jie) as this date had six "ones" rather than four, increasing the significance of the occasion. In 2011, an above-average number of marital celebrations occurred in Hong Kong and Beijing on 11 November.

Symbolism

The following symbolism has been associated with the special date:
 1: the digit 1 symbolizes an individual, a single person.
 11: two individuals finding each other and being together on one side of the special date (11.11).
 2 x (11): a celebration of two or more couples, each comprising two single individuals finding each other on the special date (11.11).

Outside China
Singles' Day has since been popularized through the internet and is now observed at several places outside of China as well. The holiday has particularly grown in Southeast Asia, with customers in the Lazada's Southeast Asian marketplaces ordering 6.5 million items in 2017. In Indonesia, for example, 11 November is dubbed by some e-commerce websites as the "Harbolnas" (National Online Shopping Day), though it is usually took place on 12 December.

In the United Kingdom, Single's Day, also called National Singles Day, is celebrated on 11 March. It was initiated by a group of internationally recognised dating experts in order to help singles either embrace their single status or 'do something about it'.

MediaMarkt, a German company, promotes Singles' Day in their stores. Belgian MediaMarkt also participates, but reactions have been negative, as 11 November is the anniversary of the Armistice of 11 November 1918 that ended World War I, and the day is associated with somber commemoration of the war dead in Belgium. In 2016, Swedish electronics retailer Elgiganten promoted a Singles Day campaign in Norway before implementing it in the other Nordic countries the following year.

Trademarks 
The term "双十一" (Double 11) was trademarked in China by Alibaba Group on 28 December 2012, under registration numbers 10136470 and 10136420. In October 2014, Alibaba threatened legal action against media outlets that accept advertising from competitors that use this term.

See also

 Sheng nu, so-called "leftover women" who remain unmarried
 Singles Awareness Day
 Singles event
 Black Day in South Korea
 Super Saturday
 Pepero Day, Korean 'Valentines day' on the same day
 Pocky & Pretz Day
 Qixi Festival, Chinese 'Valentine's Day'
 Remembrance Day and Veterans Day, military memorial days observed on the same day, in commemoration of the end of World War I.

References

External links
 Creative Singles Day

Marriage in Chinese culture
November observances
Public holidays in China
Unofficial observances
1990s neologisms
Autumn events in China